This is a list of the team rosters for each team in the Australian Baseball League.

Adelaide Giants

Auckland Tuatara

Brisbane Bandits

Canberra Cavalry

Melbourne Aces

Perth Heat

Sydney Blue Sox

References

Australian Baseball League team rosters
Baseball-related lists